"Press Enter ■" is a science fiction novella by American writer John Varley originally published  in the May 1984 issue of Isaac Asimov's Science Fiction Magazine. In 1985 it won the Locus Award for Best Novella, Hugo Award for Best Novella and Nebula Award for Best Novella.

Plot summary

Korean War veteran Victor Apfel discovers his neighbor, Charles Kluge, has died and bequeathed a significant inheritance to him. The Los Angeles Police Department is satisfied that Kluge has died by suicide, but a parallel investigation by Caltech computer expert Lisa Foo reveals that Kluge was hacking into dangerous, secretive government agencies that may have been involved in his death. Foo and Apfel become involved romantically as she follows Kluge's trail, exposing them to the same dangers.

Awards
 1987: Seiun Award - Foreign Short Fiction (Best Translated Short Story)
 1985: Hugo Award - Novella
 1985: Nebula Award - Novella
 1985: Locus Award - Novella
 1985: Science Fiction Chronicle Readers Poll - Novella

Reception and analysis
N. Katherine Hayles noted the novella exhibited "a phobic reaction to the connection [between humans and a computer network] as an unbearable form of intimacy", with the precise moment of connecting being when Apfel first receives an automated phone call at the start of the story. Foo is more explicitly described as a cyborg, both for her breast implants (which she uses for mammary intercourse, calling the act "touring the silicone valley") and her computer expertise. Donna Haraway is displeased with the manner and violence with which one character is killed, calling it "excessive destruction".

The names of many of the characters are inside jokes based on the computer brands and culture at the time: "Victor Apfel" combines the Commodore VIC-20 with the German for Apple, Lisa was the internal codename for the Apple Macintosh computer, Foo a programming term for an otherwise unidentified object, "Kluge" a term (usually kludge) for a cobbled-together system, and so on with several other names.

References

External links
 

1984 short stories
Nebula Award for Best Novella-winning works
Hugo Award for Best Novella winning works